Lepirudin is an anticoagulant that functions as a direct thrombin inhibitor.

Brand name: Refludan, Generic: Lepirudin rDNA for injection.

Lepirudin  is a recombinant hirudin derived from yeast cells.  Lepirudin is almost identical to hirudin extracted from Hirudo medicinalis, having the amino acid sequence LTYTDCTESGQNLCLCEGSNVCGQGNKCILGSDGEKNQCVTGEGTPKPQSHNDGDFEEIPEEYLQ with disulfide bridges at Cys6-Cys14, Cys16-Cys28 and Cys22-Cys39, and differs from by the substitution of leucine for isoleucine at the N-terminal end of the molecule and the absence of a sulfate group on the tyrosine at position 63.

Lepirudin may be used as an anticoagulant when heparins (unfractionated or low-molecular-weight) are contraindicated because of heparin-induced thrombocytopenia.

Market withdrawal

Bayer announced that it ceased the production of lepirudin (Refludan) on May 31, 2012. At the time of the announcement, the company expected that supply from wholesalers was going to be depleted by mid-2013.

References

External links
 
 
 
 

Direct thrombin inhibitors